Ancula espinosai is a species of sea slug, a dorid nudibranch, a marine gastropod mollusc in the family Goniodorididae.

Distribution
This species was first described from Punta Mona, Manzanillo, Limón, Costa Rica.

Description
This goniodorid nudibranch is translucent white in colour with red markings.

Ecology
Ancula espinosai probably feeds on Entoprocta which often grow on hydroids, bryozoa and other living substrata.

References

Goniodorididae
Gastropods described in 2001